The 2020 season was Strømsgodset's fourteenth season back in Eliteserien since their promotion in the 2006 season.

Season events
Prior to the start of the season Tobias Gulliksen and Sondre Hanssen were promoted from the youth team.

On 12 June, the Norwegian Football Federation announced that a maximum of 200 home fans would be allowed to attend the upcoming seasons matches.

On 10 September, the Norwegian Football Federation cancelled the 2020 Norwegian Cup due to the COVID-19 pandemic in Norway.

On 30 September, the Minister of Culture and Gender Equality, Abid Raja, announced that clubs would be able to have crowds of 600 at games from 12 October.

On 28 November, Strømsgodset's match against Odd on 2 December was postponed due to a positive COVID-19 case within the Odd squad and the whole squad having to quarantine.

Squad

Out on loan

Transfers

In

Out

Loans out

Released

Competitions

Eliteserien

Results summary

Results by round

Results

Table

Norwegian Cup

Squad statistics

Appearances and goals

|-
|colspan="14"|Players away from Strømsgodset on loan:
|-
|colspan="14"|''Players who left Strømsgodset during the season

|}

Goal scorers

Clean sheets

Disciplinary record

References

Strømsgodset
Strømsgodset Toppfotball seasons